Sail Mohamed Ameriane ben Amerzaine (October 14, 1894 – April 1953) was an Algerian and French anarchist who fought in the Spanish Civil War. The French writer Jacques Prévert dedicated a poem to him.

Life

Early life 
In 1894, Sail Mohamed was born in the Berber region of Kabylie, French Algeria. He received little education during his youth and became a driver-mechanic, until he served in the French Colonial Forces. 
He was arrested for insubordination and desertion during the First World War. He then moved to France, where he was an activist in the recently rebuilt Union Anarchiste (UA) and the Confédération Générale du Travail-Syndicaliste Révolutionnaire (CGT-SR) and with his friend Sliman Kiouane was founder (in 1923) of the Committee for the Defence of Indigenous Algerians, one of the first national liberation movements in French North Africa. Through these organizations, he denounced "the poverty of the colonialized people and colonial exploitation" and the ongoing instability in North Africa. In 1929, Sail Mohamed became the secretary of the Defence Committee of Algerians against the Centenary Provocation, an anarchist movement formed in protest to the upcoming French centenary of the conquest of Algeria (5 July 1830).

Social Awakening 
In 1932, Sail became director of L'Eveil Social (Social Awakening) where he published anti-militarist articles and was subsequently prosecuted by the French authorities for "provocation of the military to disobedience". Sail Mohamed was also a passionate anti-Stalinist, and, following his arrest in 1932, he rejected support from Red Aid, a front organisation of the French Communist Party. In 1934, the "Sail Mohamed Affair" occurred. Sail Mohamed was arrested and jailed for 4 months following an incident where he was found collecting and hiding arms for workers' movements that had risen up as a result of a fascist and anti-Semitic demonstration that occurred on 6 February 1934 in France. Sail's organization, Social Awakening, merged with the anarchist Terre Libre group soon after his release.

Later life and death 
In 1936, he served in the Sébastien Faure Century, the French-speaking section of the Durruti Column, an anarchist anti-Francoist militia in Spain. In October 1936, he became the general delegate for foreign groups, replacing Bethomieu who died in Perdiguera. He was wounded in November and returned to France in December, after sending many letters describing the anarchist movement in Spain. As soon as he recovered, he took part in the conferences organised by the Union Anarchiste on the Spanish revolution. Additionally, he soon after participated in protests against the banning of the Etoile Nord Africaine edited by Messali Hadj in Tunisia. Sail Mohamed was arrested and jailed for "provocation of the military".

At the beginning of WWII, Sail Mohamed was interned at a concentration camp in Riom. Sail would later escape by forging false papers and would spend the war underground, attempting to revive anarchist movements in occupied France. Sail Mohamed revived the Aulnay-sous-bois group and attempted to reform the Committee of Algerian Anarchists. Sail died in April 1953, with George Fontenis delivering address in Sail's honor.

See also
 Anarchism in France
 Militant anti-fascism

References

External links
 Biography at libcom.org
 Audiofile (in German language)
 Biography thread at algeria.com

Algerian anarchists
French anarchists
Anarchist partisans
French anti-fascists
Algerian anti-fascists
Anarcho-syndicalists
French people of the Spanish Civil War
1894 births
1953 deaths